Pinkwashing is a form of cause marketing that uses a pink ribbon logos. The companies display the pink ribbon logo on products that are known to cause different types of cancer. The Pink ribbon logo symbolizes support for breast cancer-related charities or foundations. 
         
The term 'pinkwashing' is associated with companies that use the pink ribbon symbol or use the support of breast cancer charities as a marketing technique, to promote one of their products, while at the same time manufactured products have proven to contain ingredients, that are linked to the disease developed or are used in a manner that associates it with the increased risk of disease.

Origin of the pink ribbon 
The pink ribbon first originated from a woman named Charlotte Hayley in 1992. Charlotte hand made and dispensed peach colored ribbons with informational cards that read " The National Cancer Institute annual budget is $1.8 billion, only 5% goes for cancer prevention. Help us wake up our legislators and Americans by wearing this ribbon". Companies such as Susan G. Komen had used the ribbon but the ribbons became most popular when Esteé Lauder agreed to place the bright pink ribbon on all the products across the United States.

Advertisement and marketing controversies
To detect 'pinkwashing' some questions to ask are "How much money is going to breast cancer research?, What company will get the funds?, and Does the companies mission reflect the marketing done?"

Something to look out for when trying to detect pink washing is the social feminist theory. “Social feminist theory emphasizes differences between women and men due to their socialization, and suggests that gender is a social outcome, an accomplishment, and essentially a relational concept. Social feminism respects women’s knowledge as unique and valid, including feminine and feminist experiences, and introduces the likelihood of gendered entrepreneurial identities” (Coleman et al., 2018, p. 8). Because breast cancer is mainly found in women, most companies that utilize this strategy are company's that have a higher female audience. 

As the largest organization monetizing breast cancer, Susan G. Komen Foundation and its licensing of a proprietary trademark is running the "pink ribbon" logo and slogan on a wide range of products. It has drawn close scrutiny over 'pinkwashing' products.

One of NBCAM's largest supporters is the Astra Zeneca Health Care Foundation. "Since the Foundation began, it has supported NBCAM's goals of public awareness, public education, knowledge sharing, and greater access to services in the fight against breast cancer". However, some scholars question the true intentions of Astra Zeneca; in P. C. Pezzullos' article, "Resisting National Breast Cancer Awareness Month: The Rhetoric of Counter public and their Cultural Performances". The Toxic Links Coalition (TLC) disapproves of Astra Zeneca being NBCAM's initial supporter. For this reason, "TLC emphasizes the importance of stopping the production of carcinogenic toxic chemicals" (Pezzullo, p. 353).
Komen promotions which have drawn criticism include Houston-based fracking equipment and vendor Baker Hughes, who sponsored $100,000 for a campaign with the tagline, "Doing their bit for a cure". Opponents insist that hydraulic fracturing extracts oil and gas, using a mixture of water and chemicals, including known or possible carcinogens. Similar concerns have been raised about automobile manufacturers as sponsors, as vehicle exhaust contains carcinogens.

Komens' own "Promise Me" perfume has also drawn Breast Cancer Action, as the label fails to disclose that the product contains galaxolide and toluene.

The "pinkwashing" issue is not limited to Komen and its sponsors. In 2007, the Estée Lauder Pink Ribbon Collection series used a donation to The Breast Cancer Research Foundation (BCRF) to promote products containing parabens, chemicals linked to breast cancer. In 2012, the Food and Drug Administration had connected 5-Hour Energy drinks, a caffeinated energy shot promoted using a Living Beyond Breast Cancer (LBBC) sponsorship as cause marketing, to thirteen deaths and serious injuries, including heart attacks.

In 2008, Think Before You Pink launched an online campaign against Yoplait, the national sponsor of Susan G. Komen's annual walk. Their pink-lidded yogurt was sold to raise money for breast cancer but was made from dairy containing the hormone rBGH or rBST (recombinant bovine growth hormone or recombinant bovine somatotrophin). With enough pressure from the public, General Mills (the manufacture of Yoplait) pledged to go rBGH free.

In 2010, Komen partnered with Kentucky Fried Chicken (KFC) briefly on a "Buckets for a Cure" campaign. In response, Breast Cancer Action launched the "What's the Cluck?" campaign, arguing that, although Komen's intentions may have been to promote KFC's new grilled chicken and vegetable meals, the same pink buckets held fried chicken, which can be attributed to high-fat diets linked to cancer risk and diseases. Komen contested and saw the marketing as effective because they were able to reach women who were not brought in by other advertisements in their neighbourhoods, like the billboards or the spokesperson at their church. According to Komen, KFC's pink buckets of chicken helped raise $4 million, and "money from partnerships such as this allowed Komen to provide screening mammograms to 600,000 women last year".<ref>"Komen's pink ribbons raise lots of green, many questions; Survivors, groups ask world's largest charity fighting breast cancer to be more sensitive", USA TODAY' July 18, 2011.</ref>

See also
 Susan G. Komen for the Cure
 Purplewashing
 Pink Ribbons, Inc.'', 2011 documentary
 Feminationalism

References

External links
 Think Before You Pink website
 National Breast Cancer Foundation
 Breast Cancer Action 

Advertising and marketing controversies
Breast cancer